The Himalayan bluetail (Tarsiger rufilatus), also called the Himalayan red-flanked bush-robin or orange-flanked bush-robin, is a small passerine bird that was formerly classed as a member of the thrush family Turdidae, but is now more generally considered to be an Old World flycatcher of Muscicapidae.  While currently under review, this taxon is not current recognized as a species by BirdLife international.

It is closely related to the red-flanked bluetail and was generally treated as a subspecies of it in the past, but as well as differing in its migratory behaviour (the red-flanked bluetail is a long-distance migrant), it also differs in the more intense blue colour of the adult males and the greyer colour of the females and juveniles.

Description and distribution

The Himalayan bluetail is a short-distance altitudinal migrant species, breeding in the Himalaya in bush layer (dwarf rhododendron in wetter areas, deciduous bushes in drier) of conifer and mixed conifer-oak forest, main species fir (Abies) but sometimes in areas with Picea smithiana or Pinus wallichiana/Cupressus torulosa forest; at 3000–4400 m, not penetrating beyond tree-line and in winters found at 1,500–2,500 m typically in broadleaf evergreen forest, dense dark undergrowth and thickets, clearings, treefall gaps with vine tangles, open woodland; commonly seen along tracks; favours ridges and mountain tops. It is insectivorous.

References

Tarsiger
Birds of Afghanistan
Birds of the Himalayas
Birds of Central China
Birds of Yunnan
Birds described in 1845